
Łosice County is a unit of territorial administration and local government (powiat) in Masovian Voivodeship, east-central Poland. It came into being on January 1, 1999, as a result of the Polish local government reforms passed in 1998.

As of 2019, its total population is 30,395, out of which the population of Łosice is 7,049 and the rural population is 23,846.

Neighbouring counties
Łosice County is bordered by Siemiatycze County to the north, Biała Podlaska County to the south-east and Siedlce County to the west.

Administrative division
The county is subdivided into six gminas (one urban-rural and five rural). These are listed in the following table, in descending order of population.

References

 
Land counties of Masovian Voivodeship